Dangelan Khvajeh (also Romanized as Dangelān Khvājeh; also known as Dangelān and Dangalān) is a village in Sadan Rostaq-e Sharqi Rural District, in the Central District of Kordkuy County, Golestan Province, Iran. At the 2006 census, its population was 2,692, in 677 families.

References 

Populated places in Kordkuy County